Quartet is a live album by McCoy Tyner released on his McCoy Tyner Music label in 2007. It was recorded in December 2006 at Yoshi's in Oakland, California and features performances by Tyner with tenor saxophonist Joe Lovano, bassist Christian McBride, and drummer Jeff "Tain" Watts.

Reception

The AllMusic review by Michael G. Nastos states, "In many ways this is a remarkable date, a well-paced program with all the pieces (save "For All We Know") timed at around ten minutes, proof positive that Tyner's game is still very much on, and hovering at a very high level".

Track listing
All compositions by McCoy Tyner except where indicated

 "Walk Spirit, Talk Spirit" – 9:31
 "Mellow Minor" – 9:51
 "Sama Layuca" – 12:22
 "Passion Dance" – 11:20
 "Search for Peace" – 11:01
 "Blues on the Corner" – 9:47
 "For All We Know" (J. Fred Coots, Sam M. Lewis) – 3:04

Personnel
 McCoy Tyner – piano
 Joe Lovano – tenor saxophone
 Christian McBride – double bass
 Jeff "Tain" Watts – drums

References

2007 live albums
McCoy Tyner live albums
McCoy Tyner Music live albums